The Goldbergs is an American television sitcom created by Adam F. Goldberg for ABC.  The Goldbergs is set in the 1980s and follows the Goldberg family. The series stars Jeff Garlin as husband Murray, Wendi McLendon-Covey as wife Beverly, and their three children. Adam, the youngest, documents their lives with his video camera. The series is based on creator Adam F. Goldberg's childhood in Jenkintown, Pennsylvania, during which he videotaped events, many of which are re-enacted throughout the program.

Series overview

Episodes

Season 1 (2013–14)

Season 2 (2014–15)

Season 3 (2015–16)

Season 4 (2016–17)

Season 5 (2017–18)

Season 6 (2018–19)

Season 7 (2019–20)

Season 8 (2020–21)

Season 9 (2021–22)

Season 10 (2022–23)

Specials

Ratings

References

General references

External links
 
 

Episodes
Lists of American sitcom episodes